The 2016–17 EuroCup Basketball season, also known as 7DAYS EuroCup, for sponsorship reasons, was the 15th season of Euroleague Basketball's secondary level professional club basketball tournament. It was the ninth season since it was renamed from the ULEB Cup to the EuroCup, and the first season under the title sponsorship name of 7DAYS.

The 2017 EuroCup Finals were played between Unicaja and Valencia Basket, and won by Unicaja, which was their first EuroCup title, and their second title overall in a European-wide competition, after they previously won the FIBA Korać Cup 16 years earlier. As the winners of the 2016–17 EuroCup Basketball competition, Unicaja qualified for the European top-tier level 2017–18 EuroLeague season.

Format changes
In April 2016, Euroleague Basketball agreed on a new competition format, with 24 teams that will compete in four groups of six teams, with a double round-robin format. The four first qualified teams of the four groups will compete in four groups of four teams, with a double round-robin format. The two first qualified teams of the four groups will play quarterfinals, semifinals, and the finals, with a best-of-three playoffs.

Team allocation
A total of 24 teams from 12 countries were expected to participate in the 2016–17 EuroCup Basketball, but finally 20 teams from 9 countries participate in the competition.

Distribution
The table below shows the default access list.

FIBA–Euroleague Basketball controversy

In July 2016, Italian clubs withdrew from the competition after several threats from FIBA, and were replaced by Lietkabelis, Krasny Oktyabr, MZT Skopje Aerodrom and Montakit Fuenlabrada. In September 2016, after the withdrawal of AEK, Partizan NIS and Stelmet Zielona Góra due to the pressures and threats they received from FIBA and National Federations, Euroleague Basketball announced that will review candidate clubs to fill the vacancies, but finally reduced to 20 teams.

Teams
The labels in the parentheses show how each team qualified for the place of its starting round:
1st, 2nd, 3rd, etc.: League position after Playoffs
WC: Wild card
AV: Allocated vacancy from any withdrawal

Round and draw dates
The schedule of the competition is as follows.

Draw
The draw was held on 7 July 2016, 13:15 CEST, at the Mediapro Auditorium in Barcelona. The 24 teams were drawn into four groups of six, with the restriction that teams from the same country could not be drawn against each other. For this purpose, Adriatic League worked as only one country. For the draw, the teams were seeded into six pots, in accordance with the Club Ranking, based on their performance in European competitions during a three-year period and the lowest possible position that any club from that league can occupy in the draw is calculated by adding the results of the worst performing team from each league.

Regular season

In each group, teams played against each other home-and-away in a round-robin format. The four first qualified teams advanced to the Top 16, while the last teams were eliminated. The rounds were 12 October, 18–19 October, 26 October, 2 November, 9 November, 16 November, 23 November, 30 November, 7 December, and 14 December 2016.

Group A

Group B

Group C

Group D

Top 16
In each group, teams played against each other home-and-away in a round-robin format. The two first qualified teams advanced to the quarterfinals, while the two last teams will be eliminated. The rounds were 4 January, 10–11 January, 17–18 January, 24–25 January, 31 January–1 February, and 8 February 2017.

Group E

Group F

Group G

Group H

Playoffs

Bracket

Quarterfinals

Semifinals

Finals

Attendances
Attendances include playoff games:

Individual statistics

Index Rating

Points

Rebounds

Assists

Other statistics

Game highs

Awards

7DAYS EuroCup MVP

7DAYS EuroCup Finals MVP

All–7DAYS EuroCup Teams

Coach of the Year

Rising Star

Round MVP
Regular season

Top 16

Quarterfinals

Semifinals

See also
2016–17 EuroLeague
2016–17 Basketball Champions League
2016–17 FIBA Europe Cup

References

External links
Official website

 
EuroCup Basketball seasons